{{DISPLAYTITLE:N,N'-Di-2-butyl-1,4-phenylenediamine}}

N,N′-Di-2-butyl-1,4-phenylenediamine is an aromatic amine used industrially as an antioxidant to prevent degradation of turbine oils, transformer oils, hydraulic fluids, lubricants, waxes, and greases. It is particularly effective for hydrocarbon products produced by cracking or pyrolysis, which are characterized by high alkene content. It is also used as an polymerisation inhibitor in production of various vinyl monomers such as acrylates.

N,N′-Di-2-butyl-1,4-phenylenediamine has the appearance of a red liquid. It is a skin sensitizer and can be absorbed through skin. It is toxic.

N,N′-Di-2-butyl-1,4-phenylenediamine is the active component of e.g. AO-22, AO-24, AO-29, and VANLUBE antioxidant mixtures, and Santoflex 44PD inhibitor.

References

Anilines
Antioxidants
Diamines